Živa Čopi (born 5 August 1998) is a Slovenian handball player for ŽRK Krka and the Slovenian national team.

She was selected to represent Slovenia at the 2017 World Women's Handball Championship but did not appear in the tournament. She represented Slovenia at the 2020 European Women's Handball Championship.

References

1998 births
Living people
Slovenian female handball players